The 1868 United States elections was held on November 3, electing the members of the 41st United States Congress. The election took place during the Reconstruction Era, and many Southerners were barred from voting. However, Congress's various Reconstruction Acts required southern states to allow Black men to vote, and their voting power was significant to the elections results.  

In the presidential election, Republican General Ulysses S. Grant defeated Democratic former governor Horatio Seymour of New York. Incumbent President Andrew Johnson sought the 1868 Democratic nomination, but Seymour took the nomination after twenty two ballots. 

Democrats gained several seats in the House elections, but Republicans continued to maintain a commanding majority. In the Senate elections, Republicans and Democrats both won seats, but Republicans maintained a huge majority in the chamber.

See also
1868 United States presidential election
1868–69 United States House of Representatives elections
1868–69 United States Senate elections

References

 
1868